Stephanus or Stephan of Byzantium (Stéphanos Byzántios;  centuryAD), was a Byzantine grammarian and the author of an important geographical dictionary entitled Ethnica. Only meagre fragments of the dictionary survive, but the epitome is extant, compiled by one Hermolaus, not otherwise identified.

Life

Nothing is known about the life of Stephanus, except that he was a Greek grammarian who was active in Constantinople, and lived after the time of Arcadius and Honorius, and before that of Justinian II. Later writers provide no information about him, but they do note that the work was later reduced to an epitome by a certain Hermolaus, who dedicated his epitome to Justinian; whether the first or second emperor of that name is meant is disputed, but it seems probable that Stephanus flourished in Byzantium in the earlier part of the sixth century AD, under Justinian I.

The Ethnica
Even as an epitome, the Ethnica is of enormous value for geographical, mythological, and religious information about ancient Greece. Nearly every article in the epitome contains a reference to some ancient writer, as an authority for the name of the place. From the surviving fragments, we see that the original contained considerable quotations from ancient authors, besides many interesting particulars, topographical, historical, mythological, and others. Stephanus cites Artemidorus, Polybius, Aelius Herodianus, Herodotus, Thucydides, Xenophon, Strabo and other writers.

The chief fragments remaining of the original work are preserved by Constantine Porphyrogennetos, De administrando imperio, ch. 23 (the article Ίβηρίαι δύο) and De thematibus, ii. 10 (an account of Sicily); the latter includes a passage from the comic poet Alexis on the Seven Largest Islands. Another respectable fragment, from the article Δύμη to the end of Δ, exists in a manuscript of the Fonds Coislin, the library formed by Pierre Séguier.

The first modern printed edition of the work was that published by the Aldine Press in Venice, 1502. The complete standard edition is still that of Augustus Meineke (1849, reprinted at Graz, 1958), and by convention, references to the text use Meineke's page numbers. A new completely revised edition in German, edited by B. Wyss, C. Zubler, M. Billerbeck, J.F. Gaertner, was published between 2006 and 2017, with a total of 5 volumes.

Editions 
 Aldus Manutius (pr.), 1502,  (Peri poleōn) = Stephanus. De urbibus  ("On cities") (Venice). Google Books
 Guilielmus Xylander, 1568,  = Stephanus. De urbibus (Basel).
 Thomas de Pinedo, 1678,  = Stephanus. De urbibus (Amsterdam). Contains parallel Latin translation. Google Books
 Claudius Salmasius (Claude Saumaise) and Abraham van Berkel, 1688,  = Stephani Byzantini Gentilia per epitomen, antehac De urbibus inscripta (Leiden). Contains parallel Latin translation. Google Books
 Lucas Holstenius, 1692, Notae & castigationes in Stephanum Byzantium De urbibus (Leiden). Google Books
 Thomas de Pinedo, 1725, Stephanus de urbibus (Amsterdam). Google Books
 Karl Wilhelm Dindorf, 1825, Stephanus Byzantinus. Opera, 4 vols, (Leipzig). Incorporating notes by L. Holsteinius, A. Berkelius, and T. de Pinedo. Google Books
 Anton Westermann, 1839, Stephani Byzantii ethnikon quae supersunt (Leipzig). Google Books
 Augustus Meineke, 1849, Stephani Byzantii ethnicorum quae supersunt (Berlin). Google Books
 Margarethe Billerbeck et al. (edd), Stephani Byzantii Ethnica. 5 volumes: 2006–2017. Berlin/New York:  Walter de Gruyter, (Corpus Fontium Historiae Byzantinae 43/1)

References

Further reading 
 Smith, W., Dictionary of Greek and Roman Biography and Mythology, vol. 3, s.v. "Stephanus" (2) of Byzantium.
 Diller, Aubrey 1938, "The tradition of Stephanus Byzantius", Transactions of the American Philological Association 69: 333–48.
 E.H. Bunbury, 1883, History of Ancient Geography (London), vol. i. 102, 135, 169; ii. 669–71.
 Holstenius, L., 1684 (posth.), Lucae Holstenii Notae et castigationes postumae in Stephani Byzantii Ethnika, quae vulgo Peri poleōn inscribuntur (Leiden).
 Niese, B., 1873, De Stephani Byzantii auctoribus (Kiel)
 Johannes Geffcken, 1886, De Stephano Byzantio (Göttingen)
 Whitehead, D. (ed.), 1994, From political architecture to Stephanus Byzantius : sources for the ancient Greek polis (Stuttgart).

6th-century Byzantine writers
6th-century Byzantine people
Ancient Greek anthologists
Ancient Greek lexicographers
Byzantine geographers
6th-century geographers